Short and Sweet may refer to:

Short and Sweet (festival), a multi-form arts platform presenting festivals in theatre, dance, music-theatre and cabaret across Australia, Asia and the Middle East.
"Short and Sweet", song by David Gilmour and Roy Harper, different version of which appear on the former's album David Gilmour and, featuring both musicians, on Harper's The Unknown Soldier
"Short and Sweet", a single by Spinal Tap
"Short and Sweet", a 1976 French comedy film, directed by Hubert Cornfield
 Short and Sweet (album), a 1992 album by the American singer Little Annie
"Short and Sweet", a song by Brittany Howard from the album Jaime

See also
Sweet 'n Short, a 1991 film made in South Africa, directed by Gray Hofmeyr